Odd Harald Lundberg (3 October 1917 – 7 March 1983) was a speed skater from Norway.

Lundberg became World Allround Champion in Helsinki in 1948, finished third in Oslo in 1949, and second in Eskilstuna in 1950. He also won a competition in Bislett, Oslo in 1946, which was announced as unofficial World Championships. At the 1948 Winter Olympics of St. Moritz, he won silver on the 5,000 m, bronze on the 1,500 m, and finished in seventh place on the 10,000 m.

Lundberg was active over a period of 25 years; his last international event was in 1958, and he participated in the Norwegian Championships in 1961, 43 years old.

Medals
An overview of medals won by Lundberg at important championships he participated in, listing the years in which he won each:

Note that the 1946 World Allround Championships were unofficial.

Personal records
To put these personal records in perspective, the WR column lists the official world records on the dates that Lundberg skated his personal records.

Lundberg has an Adelskalender score of 190.441 points.

References

External links

 Odd Lundberg at SkateResults.com
 Odd Lundberg. Deutsche Eisschnelllauf Gemeinschaft e.V. (German Skating Association).
 Evert Stenlund's Adelskalender pages
 Historical World Records. International Skating Union.
 National Championships results. Norges Skøyteforbund (Norwegian Skating Association).

1917 births
1983 deaths
Norwegian male speed skaters
Olympic speed skaters of Norway
Olympic silver medalists for Norway
Olympic bronze medalists for Norway
Speed skaters at the 1948 Winter Olympics
Olympic medalists in speed skating
Medalists at the 1948 Winter Olympics
World Allround Speed Skating Championships medalists
People from Gran, Norway
Sportspeople from Innlandet